The Mid Hills are a  low mountain range in the Mojave Desert, in San Bernardino County, California.

The Mid Hills are located entirely within Mojave National Preserve.  They are northeast of Kelso and the park's visitor center, and southeast of Cima Dome & Volcanic Field.

References 

Mountain ranges of the Mojave Desert
Mountain ranges of Southern California
Mojave National Preserve
Mountain ranges of San Bernardino County, California